Clepsis crispinana is a species of moth of the family Tortricidae. It is found in Russia (Altai Mountains, Sayan Mountains) and Mongolia.

The wingspan is about 23 mm. The forewings are ochreous yellow and the hindwings are greyish brown.

References

Moths described in 1919
Clepsis